PlayStation VR Worlds is a video game compilation developed by London Studio and published by Sony Interactive Entertainment. It was released in October 2016 as a launch game for the PlayStation 4's virtual reality headset PlayStation VR. The game includes five different experiences, including London Heist, VR Luge, Scavenger's Odyssey, Ocean Descent and Danger Ball. The game received mixed reviews upon release.

Gameplay
As a virtual reality game, PlayStation VR Worlds features five different experiences, including the following:
 London Heist: It is a first-person shooter in which the player controls a mobster who is tasked to steal a diamond.
 VR Luge: In VR Luge, the player character leans on a street luge sled and slides down a highway while evading other vehicles.
 Scavenger's Odyssey: Players explore a sci-fi location using vehicles and defeat aliens using the Scavenger beam and pulse cannons
 Ocean Descent: The player character descends to the depth of the ocean and observes different marine wildlife.
 Danger Ball: Danger Ball is a sports game in which the player avatar uses their head to hit a ball.

Development
London Studio was the game's developer. It was officially revealed in March 2016. Prior to the game's announcement, Ocean Descent (formerly known as Into the Deep), London Heist and VR Luge were created as tech demo for the PlayStation VR. Only the London Heist level allows the use of the PlayStation Move controller. The game was released on October 13, 2016 as a launch game for the virtual reality headset of PlayStation 4, PlayStation VR.

Reception

The game received mixed reviews according to review aggregator Metacritic. London Heist was commonly named by critics as one of the game's best levels. Ocean Descent was also praised, though many critics noted it as a "passive" experience. Scavengers Odyssey was heavily criticized for inducing motion sickness. The game's lack of replayability and expensive price were also criticized, with Chris Carter from Destructoid calling the title a "paid demo".

Legacy
The London Heist level was expanded by London Studio into a full game named Blood & Truth, which was released on May 28, 2019.

References

2016 video games
London Studio games
PlayStation 4 games
PlayStation 4-only games
PlayStation VR games
Single-player video games
Sony Interactive Entertainment game compilations
Video games developed in the United Kingdom
Video games set in London